"Stan" is a song by American rapper Eminem featuring vocals sampled from the opening lines of British singer Dido's song "Thank You". It was released on November 20, 2000, as the third single from Eminem's third album, The Marshall Mathers LP (2000). "Stan" peaked at number 51 on the Billboard Hot 100. Outside of the United States, "Stan" topped the charts in 12 countries, including the United Kingdom, Germany, Australia, and Ireland.

The 45 King-produced track also uses a slightly modified break from "Thank You" as its base sample; both songs were released as singles in late 2000. Retrospectively, "Stan" has been called one of Eminem's best songs, and, alongside "The Real Slim Shady" and "Lose Yourself", is considered one of his signature songs. In 2003, Rolling Stone magazine ranked "Stan" 296th on its list of The 500 Greatest Songs of All Time, upping their ranking to 223rd in a 2021 updated list. The song was also listed 15th on VH1s list of the greatest hip-hop songs of all time and named in the Rock and Roll Hall of Fame's 500 Songs that Shaped Rock and Roll.

The song was nominated for multiple awards, including Best Song at the MTV Europe Music Awards, Video of the Year, Best Rap Video, Best Direction, and Best Cinematography at the MTV Video Music Awards. It won Best International Artist Video at the MuchMusic Video Awards. In April 2011, Complex magazine put together a list of the 100 greatest Eminem songs and ranked "Stan" second. The eponymous character's name gave rise to a slang term that refers to overzealous, maniacal, overly obsessed, entitled fans of a celebrity or personality; the term has since been included in the Oxford English Dictionary.

Lyrics
The song tells the story of a person named Stanley "Stan" Mitchell (voiced by Eminem) who claims to be Eminem's biggest fan. It has been suggested the name "Stan" is a portmanteau of the words stalker and fan, though it is unknown if the name was chosen with that intention. He writes Eminem several letters; over two verses, he is shown to be obsessive over the rapper, and grows increasingly frustrated and angry when there is no reply. He finally creates a voice recording of himself while driving his car on the highway, having consumed large quantities of depressants and alcohol; this verse includes a call-back to Eminem's "My Name Is" with the lyrics "I drank a fifth of vodka, you dare me to drive?" He reveals that his pregnant girlfriend is tied up in the trunk as he approaches a bridge. Right before he drives off the bridge, he quickly realizes that he has no way to send the tape to Eminem.

The fourth verse features Eminem as himself, writing back to Stan and attempting to reason with him. Eminem tries to explain to Stan that while he does appreciate having him as a fan and is incredibly grateful, he worries that Stan might not always be taking the lyrics of his songs in the right way. Eminem also urges Stan to receive help for his mental health, or he could end up like that man he had just seen on the news who had driven his car off a bridge in a drunken stupor, killing himself and his pregnant girlfriend. In a demonstration of dramatic irony, Eminem then realises halfway through writing his letter that that man was actually Stan.

Music video
Directed by Dr. Dre and Philip Atwell, the video is a literal interpretation of the story. The video features Devon Sawa as Stan and Dido as his pregnant girlfriend. A prologue involves Stan dyeing his hair blonde and reacting angrily to being called "Stanley" by his girlfriend. Later, he sits in a basement full of Eminem's posters, writing letters that express his devotion as "your (Eminem's) biggest fan". He is aware of every development in Eminem's personal life.

Stan gets angry at his girlfriend (Dido) when she interrupts him watching Eminem's “The Way I Am” video.

Stan wants Eminem to contact him through a personal letter or a phone call; but, due to unfortunate circumstances, the letters fail to reach Eminem in a timely manner. Believing he has been ignored, Stan uses a tape recorder to record himself driving along a rain-soaked highway while his girlfriend is locked up in the trunk; which he does with the intention of driving off a bridge. In the process, Stan references both "My Name Is" ("I drank a fifth of vodka, dare me to drive?") and an urban legend about Phil Collins's "In the Air Tonight" before realizing that there is no way of transmitting this final tape to Eminem. The car then breaks through the bridge barrier, sealing both occupants' fates.

Stan's mother and his little brother Matthew visit his grave. When Matthew opens his hoodie, he has dyed his hair blonde like Stan. Eminem finally gets around to responding to Stan. He apologizes for being late, thanks him for being a fan, and expresses interest in Stan's personal life. Eminem worries about Stan's mental state and says he does not want Stan to end up like a story he had seen on the news recently—a man who had driven drunk off a bridge with his girlfriend in the trunk, about whom he then realizes, "It was you. Damn." Unbeknownst to Eminem, flashes of lightning shine on his window, revealing the ghost of Stan silently glaring. The video ends with Matthew staring at Stan's grave.

Censorship
In the MTV "clean" version, the song and video were censored. Significant portions from the first two verses and most of the third verse were removed. MTV also cut out all traces of Stan's girlfriend bound in the trunk of the car and removed one scene showing him guzzling vodka while driving. In the MTV full version, which is 8:15 long, verse 3 censors Stan mentioning his girlfriend in the trunk (so "Shut up bitch" and "screaming in the trunk" is censored), and about him not slitting her throat, but tied her up, and "if she suffocates, she'll suffer more, then she'll die too", which "slit", "tied her up", "suffocates", and "die" is censored.

Dido has stated that she was gagged in the third verse of the video, however this was censored so widely that versions with her gagged are rare. In the uncensored version, Stan is shown drinking at the wheel of the car before showing Dido struggling in the trunk of the car. She manages to remove the duct tape from her mouth and screams before struggling for breath. Most versions were censored so that there is only a brief clip of Dido in the trunk of the car towards the end of the verse. It also censors when Stan says he "drank a fifth of vodka", which censors "drank" and "vodka"; and censors when he says he's on "a thousand downers", which "downers" is censored; and also censors Stan drinking while driving. At the end of the third verse, "Well, gotta go, I'm almost at the bridge now" is changed to "Well, gotta go, I'm almost at the end of the bridge now". In the fourth verse, the line "[And what's this] shit about us meant to be together" is completely censored. All references to the girlfriend in the trunk are censored, including the screaming in the background, and the line: "And had his girlfriend in his trunk, and she was pregnant with his kid."

In the MTV short version, which was used for radio airplay due to time constraints, the second verse lines that are missing are from "I ain't that mad though, I just don't like bein' lied to" to "I even got a tattoo of your name across the chest"; the video cuts showing Stan meeting Eminem, talking about how his father cheated and beat his mother and showed him getting a "Slim Shady" tattoo on his chest. The missing lyrics from the third verse are of Stan talking about drinking while driving and referencing "In the Air Tonight", (Eminem quotes the title as "In the Air of the Night) which in the video, it skips from showing Stan near-missing a car, and swerving to avoid crashing into it. The lines that are missing are from "Hey Slim, I drank a fifth of vodka, you dare to me to drive?" to "I hope you know I ripped all of your pictures off the wall". It also removes the chorus after the third verse and goes straight to the fourth verse; the video then cuts to Eminem at last receiving the letter from Stan, and the car sinking more into the water.

In Fuse's original state as a rock and alternative station, the same versions of the video were shown as on MTV. However, in later Fuse airings, more lines and words are silenced than on the clean version of the LP; half of one of the beginning verses are cut out, and then the song fades out about halfway through the second verse, after playing for approximately two minutes. "Stan" was also released on track 17 of Curtain Call: The Hits; on the clean and explicit versions, the live track censored only the profanity, unlike the clean version of the studio track.

Critical reception
"Stan" was met with critical acclaim, with praise directed to the song's epistolary narrative structure, emotional range and lyrical depth. Stephen Thomas Erlewine highlighted the song. Entertainment Weekly praised the song, too: "Eminem proves himself a peerless rap poet with a profound understanding of the power of language. Stan, an epistolary exchange between the artist and a dangerously obsessive fan, may be the most moving song about star worship ever recorded" and added that "Stan" blazes significant new ground for rap. The Los Angeles Times was also positive: Stan', the album's most haunting track, is superb storytelling with a point. It has the affecting tone of such rap high points as Ice Cube's 'It Was a Good Day' and Tupac's 'Dear Mama'."

NME magazine praised the song: Stan' is a wonderful short story, an astute study in extreme fandom." Sputnik Music described that "Stan's sampling of Dido and use of rain and writing sound effects" make the album versatile. The same critic listed the song in the Recommended Downloads list and reviewed it:If you haven't heard this, you probably make a career out of living under rocks. It tells the story of an obsessive fan who kills themselves because their idol (Eminem) never writes back, and introduces one of the album's key themes – the scary power of fame. Ironic, then, that this album made him the biggest cultural figurehead on the planet. It starts with a sample of Dido's 'Thank You' under a sample of rain. This sample goes on to form the song's hook, relating the level of Stan's obsession and almost making him a sympathetic character (Your picture on my wall/It reminds me that it's not so bad....). Offsetting this is Eminem's raps under the persona of Stan, which reveal him as a reprehensible character; mentally unstable, self-mutilating, sexually confused, volatile, and abusive to his pregnant girlfriend (whose life he takes too, when he takes his own). Eminem's final verse is him attempting to write back, asking him not to be like this guy he saw on the news....Overplayed? Yes. But even so, of all of Eminem's singles, this one demonstrates his power as a rapper and his skill as a poet best. IGN praised the song as "easily the most scathingly introspective rumination on fan adoration, idol assimilation, and borderline stalker etiquette. Teamed to Dido's lulling 'Thank You' with its almost somnambulistically hypnotic pop sultriness provides a jolting contrast to the twisted storyline of a musical obsession gone awry. It also paints a picture of what it's like to be knee deep in the push-and-pull world of a superstar. The song's poignancy never fades, even almost five years later it's still potent." Slant Magazine was mixed: Stan' is an interesting look into the mind of a fanatic (albeit through the eyes of an equally disturbed individual), but it's structured entirely around someone else's work (Dido's 'Thank You')."

Legacy 

"Stan" is one of Eminem's most  acclaimed songs and has been called a "cultural milestone", referred to as "Eminem's best song" by About.com. Analyzing "Stan" in The Guardian, writer and literary critic Giles Foden compared Eminem to Robert Browning.

At the 2001 Grammy Awards, when he was facing criticism from GLAAD over his lyrics, Eminem responded by performing "Stan" with singer-songwriter Elton John singing Dido's lines. Many of the profanities were substituted, for example, "You're like his favorite idol" in place of "You're like his fucking idol", and "stuff" for "shit". Recordings of this performance were available for download on Eminem's official website Eminem.com and, later, on his 2005 greatest hits album Curtain Call: The Hits.

Rapper Canibus released a response track to "Stan" titled "U Didn't Care" in which Canibus, imitating Stan, accused Eminem of not caring about him.
Christian rap artist KJ-52 recorded two songs: "Dear Slim" and "Dear Slim, Part II", which attempted to contact Eminem in an allusion to "Stan". Eminem later referenced a fan who had written a letter saying he was praying for him in "Careful What You Wish For". "My Life" by The Game samples "Stan". Conservative rapper Tom MacDonald recorded a response track to Stan in 2021. After Eminem released a series of NFTs as part of his "Shady Con" event with Nifty Gateway, MacDonald purchased one—an Eminem-produced instrumental called "Stan's Revenge"—for $100,000. MacDonald used the instrumental to create his song "Dear Slim", released in May 2021. The song's accompanying music video paid homage to the music video for "Stan".

"Stan" has entered the lexicon as a term for an overly-obsessed fan of someone or something and is used colloquially to express fandom of all kinds. The term is especially popular in the rap community; in "Ether", a diss track against rapper Jay-Z, Nas notably called Jay a "stan" of both himself and The Notorious B.I.G. The term was added to the Oxford English Dictionary in 2017.

"Stan" has been listed by many as one of the greatest rap songs of all time. It was ranked number three on a list of the greatest rap songs in history by Q magazine and came tenth in a similar survey conducted by Top40-Charts.com. Rolling Stone magazine's list of the "500 Greatest Songs of All Time" ranked it number 290, one of Eminem's two songs on the list along with "Lose Yourself"; in the updated 2010 list, it was ranked at number 296. It ranked number 45 on About.com's "Top 100 Rap Songs".

The song ranked number 15 on VH1's "100 Greatest Songs of Hip Hop", and number two on their "Countdown Millennium Songs". It was also named the "46th Best Song of the Decade" by Complex magazine, and the 10th Best Song of the decade by Rolling Stone. The song was ranked at number 58 in Rolling Stones list of "100 Greatest Hip-Hop songs of all time". In 2017, Rolling Stone ranked the song number two on their list of the 50 greatest Eminem songs, and in 2020, The Guardian ranked the song number one on their list of the 30 greatest Eminem songs.

"Stan" has influenced many other hip-hop songs, including Tyler, the Creator's 2013 song "Colossus", off of Wolf. This track dwells on similar themes as "Stan", such as growing up without a father, feeling like an outsider, and deep emotional attachment to a rapper.

Eminem has referenced "Stan" in some of his later songs, including "River", "Walk on Water", "The Ringer", the diss track "Killshot", and his verse on "Calm Down" by Busta Rhymes.

Eminem's song "Bad Guy", the opening track on The Marshall Mathers LP 2, is a sequel to Stan. The song is Matthew tracking down Eminem in an attempt to kill him, which he succeeds in doing so. After he dies in the song, Eminem is sent to hell in the song as a punishment for Stan's death.

In 2020, Saturday Night Live featured a Christmas parody of "Stan" called "Stu", featuring Pete Davidson as Stu writing to Santa and becoming increasingly angry when he does not answer his requests for a PlayStation 5, with a cameo appearance from Eminem himself who does receive the system for Christmas. Unlike the final verse in the actual song, Santa blows off Stu in his reply, claiming he had the wrong address the whole time.

In 2022 at Eminem's Rock and Roll Hall of Fame induction ceremony performance, he performed the song with Ed Sheeran who played guitar during the song and sang Dido's lines.

Awards and nominations

Track listing

Notes
 signifies a co-producer.

Credits
 Singing and lyrics: Eminem, Dido 
 Production: Eminem, The 45 King
 Mixing: Eminem
 Guitar and bass: Mike Elizondo
 Keyboard: Mike Elizondo, Tommy Coster
 Composer: Marshall Mathers, Dido Armstrong, The 45 King
 Executive producer: Dr. Dre
 Producer video: Chris Palladino
 Cinematographer: Dariusz Wolski
 Directors: Philip G. Atwell & Dr. Dre
 Appearances in the clip: Devon Sawa, Dido, Nathan Mathers, Eminem

Charts

Weekly charts

Year-end charts

Decade-end charts

Certifications

See also

 List of best-selling singles
 List of European number-one hits of 2000
 List of number-one singles of 2000 (Ireland)
 List of number-one hits of 2000 (Switzerland)
 List of UK Singles Chart number ones of the 2000s
 List of Austrian number-one hits of 2001
 List of number-one singles in Australia in 2001
 List of number-one hits in Denmark
 List of number-one hits of 2001 (Germany)
 List of number-one hits of 2001 (Italy)
 List of Romanian Top 100 number ones of the 2000s
 Parasocial relationship
 "Bad Guy" (Eminem song)
 "Mi bebito fiu fiu", a parody song

References

External links

 
 

Eminem songs
Dido (singer) songs
Songs about driving under the influence
Songs about suicide
2000s ballads
2000s fads and trends
Contemporary R&B ballads
Vehicle wreck ballads
2000 singles
Horrorcore songs
Uxoricide in fiction
Murder–suicide in fiction
Music video controversies
Number-one singles in Australia
Number-one singles in Austria
Number-one singles in Denmark
European Hot 100 Singles number-one singles
Number-one singles in Finland
Number-one singles in Germany
Number-one singles in Iceland
Irish Singles Chart number-one singles
Number-one singles in Italy
Number-one singles in Romania
Number-one singles in Scotland
Number-one singles in Switzerland
UK Singles Chart number-one singles
Songs written by Dido (singer)
Songs written by Eminem
Song recordings produced by Eminem
Songs about domestic violence
Songs about mental health
Songs about fictional male characters
Songs about stalking
Songs about letters (message)
Songs about pregnancy
Shady Records singles
Aftermath Entertainment singles
Interscope Records singles
Borderline personality disorder in fiction
Self-harm in fiction
2000 songs
Murder ballads
American hip hop songs
Obscenity controversies in music